"Let's Groove" is a song by American band Earth, Wind & Fire, released as the first single from their eleventh studio album, Raise! (1981). It is written by Maurice White and Wayne Vaughn, and produced by White. The song was a commercial success, and was the band's highest-charting single in various territories. It peaked inside the top 20 in countries including the United States, New Zealand, United Kingdom, Canada and other component charts in America. In 1979 and the early 1980s, there was a severe backlash against disco music. In spite of this, the band decided to revive the disco sound that was included on their previous works and later records. Musically, "Let's Groove" is post-disco, pop and funk which includes instrumentation of synthesizers and keyboards along with live electric guitars.

Overview
"Let's Groove" was produced by Maurice White for Kalimba Productions. With a duration of five minutes and thirty nine seconds, the song has a tempo of 126 beats per minute.

Critical reception
Ken Tucker of Rolling Stone described Let's Groove as "city music" where "the horn section screams like a car running a red light." Record World praised the "deep, brawny bass line." Ed Hogan from AllMusic noted that White "brought in guitarist Roland Bautista and began co-writing, with Emotions member Wanda Vaughn and her husband Wayne Vaughn, a song that reflected the then-emerging electronic sound of the '80s. Not to be confused with the same-named hit by Archie Bell & the Drells, "Let's Groove" certainly was a change. Starting off with a robotic-sounding vocoder riff, it served up a more gritty-sounding EWF for the 1980s, laced with Brecker Brothers-supplied horn blasts that rival those of EWF's 1976 gold single 'Getaway'." People though said that the album's "biggest disappointment is Let's Groove, yet another gotta-boogie tune." Jordan Bartel of The Baltimore Sun noted that the song was "quite possibly the funkiest thing to come out of the early 1980s". Richard Williams of The Times wrote "Let's Groove, the bass-heavy new single, is a reliable pointer". Whitney Pastorek of Entertainment Weekly declared that "I actually love this song, especially the little computer voice in the background, like Pac-Man has come to life to boogie just for me!"

NME placed Let's Groove at number 16 on their Singles of the Year list of 1981. "Let's Groove" was also Grammy nominated in the category of Best R&B Vocal Performance by a Duo or Group.

Commercial performance
The song peaked at number three in the US, becoming their 7th and last top 10 hit. It also spent eight weeks at number one on the Billboard Hot Soul Singles chart in late 1981 and early 1982 and was the second R&B song of 1982 on the year-end charts.

The single sold over a million copies in the US and has been certified gold by the RIAA as until the RIAA lowered the sales levels for certified singles in 1989, a Gold single equalled 1 million units sold. "Let's Groove" was also certified silver in the UK by the British Phonographic Industry.

Music video
The accompanying music video of "Let's Groove" was the first ever to be played on Video Soul on BET. Heavy with vintage electronic effects, the video was created by Ron Hays using the Scanimate analog computer system at Image West, Ltd.

The whole style of the music video later went on to influence Bruno Mars' "Treasure".

Personnel 

 Writing – Maurice White, Wayne Vaughn
 Producer – Maurice White
 Assistant Producer - Larry Dunn, Verdine White
 Programmer – Larry Dunn
 String, horn arrangement – Billy Meyers

Engineers
 Assistant Engineer – Tom Perry
 Mixing Engineer – Mick Guzauski, Tom Perry
 Recording Engineer – Ken Fowler, Mick Guzauski, Ron Pendragon

Performers
 Saxophone – Tom Saviano
 Alto Saxophone – Don Myrick
 Tenor Saxophone – Andrew Woolfolk, Don Myrick
 Bass – Verdine White
 Cello – Frederick Seykora, Jerome Kessler, Larry Corbett, Marie Louise Zeyen, Paula Hochhalter, Selene Burford
 Concert Master – Assa Drori, James Getzoff
 Drums – Fred White
 Guitar – Beloyd Taylor, Johnny Graham, Roland Bautista
 Keyboards – Billy Meyers, David Foster, Wayne Vaughn
 Percussion – Fred White, Maurice White, Philip Bailey, Ralph Johnson
 Piano – Larry Dunn
 Synthesizer – Larry Dunn, Michael Boddiker
 Trombone – Bill Reichenbach, Charles Loper, Dick Hyde, George Bohanon, Lew McCreary, Louis Satterfield
 Trumpet – Chuck Findley, Gary Grant, Jerry Hey, Larry Hall, Michael Harris, Oscar Brashear, Rahmlee Michael Davis
 Viola – Alan Deveritch, Allan Harshman, Gareth Nuttycombe, Pamela Hochhalter, Virginia Majewski
 Violin – Anton Sen, Arkady Shindelman, Arnold Belnick, Betty Lamagna, Brian Leonard, Denyse Buffum, Endre Granat, Haim Shtrum, Henry Ferber, Irving Geller, Jerome Reisler, John Wittenbert, Mari Tsumura Botnick, Marvin Limonick, Myra Kestenbaum, Nathan Ross, Norman Leonard, Reginald Hill, Ronald Folsom, Sheldon Sanov, Thomas Buffum, William Hymanson, William Kurasch
 Vocal – Beloyd Taylor, Maurice White, Ms. Pluto, Philip Bailey, Ralph Johnson
 Background Vocal – Maurice White, Philip Bailey

Accolades

Charts

Weekly charts

Year-end charts

Certifications

CDB version

"Let's Groove" was covered in 1995 by the Australian R&B/pop boy band CDB. In Australia it reached number 2 and was certified platinum for shipments of over 70,000 units. In New Zealand it peaked at number 1 for three weeks and also received a platinum certification, indicating sales exceeding 10,000 copies. At the ARIA Music Awards of 1996 "Let's Groove" won the Highest Selling Single category.

Track listing
CD single (662147 2)
"Let's Groove" – 4:17
"You Will Be Mine" – 4:07
"Let's Groove" (Summer Groove)  – 5:05
"Let's Groove" (Instrumental)  – 4:19

Charts

Weekly charts

Year-end charts

Certifications

Asia's Got Talent judges version

"Let's Groove" was covered by the Asia's Got Talent judges—David Foster, Anggun, Melanie C and Vanness Wu—and released as a promotional single on 14 May 2015 by Universal. It was released as a charity single for the May 2015 Nepal earthquake and all money raised was donated to the victims. This version was produced by David Foster.

Promotion
On May 14, 2015, the four artists performed the song in the final of first season of Asia's Got Talent. On June 4, the Asia's Got Talent released the behind the scenes video of the recording.

Track listing
Digital download
"Let's Groove" – 3:32

Release history

See also
List of number-one R&B singles of 1981 (U.S.)
List of number-one singles from the 1990s (New Zealand)

References

1981 songs
1981 singles
1995 singles
2015 singles
Columbia Records singles
Earth, Wind & Fire songs
CDB (band) songs
Melanie C songs
Number-one singles in New Zealand
Post-disco songs
Songs written by Maurice White
Sony Music singles
Universal Music Group singles
Songs about dancing